The Welland Sabres are a defunct Tier II Junior "A" ice hockey team that were based out of Welland, Ontario and was a part of the Southern Ontario Junior A Hockey League.

Season-by-season results

Playoffs
1971 Lost Semi-final
Detroit Jr. Red Wings defeated Welland Sabres 3-games-to-none with 2 ties
1972 Lost Quarter-final
Detroit Jr. Red Wings defeated Welland Sabres 4-games-to-1
1973 Lost Semi-final
Chatham Maroons defeated Welland Sabres 4-games-to-2 with 1 tie
1974 Lost Semi-final
Welland Sabres defeated Niagara Falls Flyers 4-games-to-1
Chatham Maroons defeated Welland Sabres 4-games-to-2
1975 Lost Quarter-final
Guelph CMC's defeated Welland Sabres 4-games-to-1
1976 Lost Semi-final
Guelph Platers defeated Welland Sabres 4-games-to-1

Notable alumni
Jim Bedard
Ken Breitenbach
Dan McCourt

External links
 Welland Sabres Website
OHA Website

Defunct ice hockey teams in Canada
Ice hockey teams in Ontario
Sport in Welland